New Perry Hotel is a historic hotel in Perry, Georgia, located at 800 Main Street.  It consists of a three-story Neoclassical hotel built in 1925 and a one-story, eight-room Colonial Revival motel, which was built in 1955 and enlarged in 1959 with a pool and cabana.  In 1947 a kitchen and banquet hall were built.  Between 1955 and 1959 the rear lobby was converted into the motel office and a card room was built.  The original full-height portico was altered in 1965.  The round Tuscan columns were replaced by square Tuscan columns.

It was designed by architects Dennis and Dennis;  Davenport Guerry was the landscape architect.

It was added to the National Register of Historic Places on April 1, 2004.  The hotel closed about 2014.

See also
National Register of Historic Places listings in Houston County, Georgia

References

Further reading
 "Enjoy Old Fashioned Elegant Dining at the New Perry Hotel", by Mary Ann Anderson, Georgia Backroads, Spring 2008, pp. 58-59.

Hotel buildings on the National Register of Historic Places in Georgia (U.S. state)
Taverns in Georgia (U.S. state)
Buildings and structures in Houston County, Georgia